Danish airline Cimber Sterling operated the following services . The airline ceased operations and cancelled all flights as of 3 May 2012.

Europe
Bulgaria
Burgas – Burgas Airport
Czech Republic
Prague – Prague Airport
Denmark
Aalborg – Aalborg Airport
Billund – Billund Airport
Copenhagen – Kastrup Airport base
Karup – Karup Airport
Rønne – Bornholm Airport
Sønderborg – Sønderborg Airport
France
Montpellier – Montpellier–Méditerranée Airport
Nice – Nice Côte d'Azur Airport
Greece
Chania – Chania International Airport
Italy
Florence – Peretola Airport
Naples – Naples International Airport
Rome – Leonardo da Vinci-Fiumicino Airport
Portugal
Funchal – Madeira Airport [ended 30 April 2012]
Spain
Barcelona – Barcelona Airport 
Málaga – Málaga Airport
Palma de Mallorca – Palma de Mallorca Airport 
Las Palmas de Gran Canaria – Las Palmas Airport 
Tenerife – Tenerife South Airport [ended 24 April 2012]
Sweden
Norrköping – Norrköping Airport
Stockholm – Arlanda Airport
Stockholm – Bromma Airport
Gothenburg – Göteborg Landvetter Airport
Turkey
Antalya – Antalya Airport

Previously terminated destinations 
Asia
Israel – Tel Aviv
Australia
Australia – Sydney
Europe
Austria – Salzburg
Croatia – Split
Ireland – Dublin
Serbia – Belgrade
Spain – Alicante, Las Palmas de Gran Canaria
Ukraine – Kiev-Borispil
United Kingdom – London-Gatwick

External links 
Cimber Sterling

References 

Lists of airline destinations